Bulz, also called urs de mămăligă, is a Romanian dish composed by roasting polenta (mămăligă) and cheese in an oven. Bulz is often eaten with sour cream.

In June 2010, the town of Covasna established the record of the biggest bulz of the world with a length of 50 meters. This record was recognized by Guinness World Records.

Serving examples

See also 
 Cocoloşi
 Mămăligă în pături
 List of maize dishes

Notes and references 

Romanian dishes
Maize dishes